Oliver Henry Welf (January 17, 1889 – June 15, 1967) was a Major League Baseball player who played for one season. He made one appearance for the Cleveland Indians as a pinch runner on August 30 during the 1916 Cleveland Indians season. He was an outfielder during his minor league career.

External links

1889 births
1967 deaths
Cleveland Indians players
Baseball players from Cleveland
Greenwood Chauffeurs players
Greenwood Scouts players
Meridian White Ribbons players
Hattiesburg Timberjacks players
Columbus Joy Riders players